Daniel Weinstein (born February 4, 1981) is a retired American short track speed skating competitor and two-time Olympian.

Biography
Of the handful of Jewish-American Olympians who competed in the 1998 Winter Olympics at Nagano, Japan, Weinstein was by far the youngest.  At 17 years of age, he was not only the youngest athlete on the U.S. speedskating team, he was also the youngest man on the entire U.S. Winter Olympics Team.  Four years later, Weinstein competed in the 2002 Winter Olympics in Salt Lake City, Utah.

Weinstein has won multiple individual distance US Championships, and he won the men's overall title at the 2000 U.S. Short Track Speedskating Championships.

In 1994, Weinstein was the youngest person to ever skate in the Olympic trials, but he placed poorly.

Raised in Brookline, Massachusetts, he began skating at age eight, after his parents saw an article about local speedskating in the Boston Globe.

He completed his bachelor's degree at Harvard University in 2004, and his MBA at The Tuck School of Business at Dartmouth in 2009.

See also
List of select Jewish speed skaters

References

Sources
 Jewish Sports profile
 Dan Weinstein '03: Go Speed Racer Go, Harvard Crimson, March 2, 2000 (via Google Cache)
Dan Weinstein at ISU
Dan Weinstein at the-sports.org

1981 births
Living people
American male short track speed skaters
Olympic short track speed skaters of the United States
Short track speed skaters at the 1998 Winter Olympics
Short track speed skaters at the 2002 Winter Olympics
Sportspeople from Brookline, Massachusetts
Harvard University alumni
Jewish American sportspeople
American male speed skaters
Tuck School of Business alumni
21st-century American Jews